Akhi Jan (also Romanized as Ākhī Jān and Akhījān) is a village in Chaharduli Rural District, Keshavarz District, Shahin Dezh County, West Azerbaijan Province, Iran. At the 2006 census, its population was 159, in 45 families.

References 

Populated places in Shahin Dezh County